Rebeka Katalin Szabó (born November 20, 1977) is a Hungarian biologist, ecologist and politician, member of the National Assembly (MP) from Politics Can Be Different (LMP) National List between 2010 and 2014.

Education
She earned a degree in biology at Faculty of Science of the Eötvös Loránd University.

Political career
She was a founding member of the LMP party between 2009 and 2013. She was elected to the National Assembly from the party's National List during the 2010 Hungarian parliamentary election. She had been a member of the Committee on Agriculture between May 14, 2010 and February 11, 2013. She became a member of the Committee of National Cohesion on February 25, 2013.

In January 2013, the LMP's congress rejected against the electoral cooperation with other opposition forces, including Together 2014. As a result members of LMP’s “Dialogue for Hungary” platform, including Rebeka Szabó, announced their decision to leave the opposition party and form a new organization. Benedek Jávor said he eight MPs leaving LMP would keep their parliamentary mandates. The leaving MPs established Dialogue for Hungary as a full-fledged party.

In November 2014, Szabó was elected to the Zugló council, where she became Deputy Mayor.

Szabó was elected co-leader of the Dialogue for Hungary, alongside Bence Tordai in July 2022.

References

1977 births
Living people
Hungarian biologists
Hungarian ecologists
Women members of the National Assembly of Hungary
Eötvös Loránd University alumni
LMP – Hungary's Green Party politicians
Dialogue for Hungary politicians
Members of the National Assembly of Hungary (2010–2014)
Members of the National Assembly of Hungary (2022–2026)
Politicians from Budapest
21st-century Hungarian women politicians